Dogs in Canada was a magazine about dogs published in Canada between the 19th and 21st centuries. Issues were published on a monthly basis, along with an annual edition that was typically released in mid-November.

History and profile
Founded in 1889, Dogs in Canada was the oldest continually-published magazine in Canada. It was started as a newsletter for the Canadian Kennel Club (CKC), and was owned by Apex Publishing Ltd, a wholly owned subsidiary of The CKC. 

The magazine featured articles about dogs, and though it originally focused purely on Pedigree dogs and dog shows, it evolved to become a more general-interest dog magazine. This change caused controversy. A subscription was previously included in the price of membership of the CKC, and some CKC members believed that if the price of subscription was included in the fee, then the magazine should focus solely on purebred dogs. Subsequently, CKC-members who did not like the more mainstream content could elect not to receive the magazine. However, following some changes in editorial staff, the magazine appeared to have bowed to pressure from the CKC, and its focus returned to promoting the interests of pedigree breeders, and CKC members in particular.

The December 2011 edition and 2012 annual marked the final publication of Dogs in Canada. This followed a decision by the Canadian Kennel Club to close its publishing arm, Apex Publishing. The closure followed a report by Apex that there was no reasonable expectation of profit from the publication.

Columns & Departments
Nutrition
Citizen canine
Behavior
Brushing up
Health basics
Barks
Breed lines
Feedback - Letters to the editor

Features focus
Health
Animal welfare
Sporting activities
Human-animal bond
Travel
Lifestyle
Training & behavior
Breeding
History & the arts

References

External links
CKC website

 
1889 establishments in Canada
2011 disestablishments in Canada
Animal and pet magazines
Hobby magazines published in Canada
Monthly magazines published in Canada
Magazines established in 1889
Magazines disestablished in 2011
Defunct magazines published in Canada